The Mount Olive United Methodist Church is a historic church at Lafayette and Knox Streets in Van Buren, Arkansas.  It is a rectangular single-story brick structure with Gothic Revival styling.  Its main facade has a large Gothic-arch window below the main roof gable, and a squat square tower to its left, housing the entrance in a Gothic-arched opening.  The church was built in 1889 for a congregation that consisted of recently emancipated African-American former slaves when it was organized in 1869.  It is a significant local landmark in its African-American culture and history.

The church was listed on the National Register of Historic Places in 1976.

See also
National Register of Historic Places listings in Crawford County, Arkansas

References

United Methodist churches in Arkansas
Churches on the National Register of Historic Places in Arkansas
Gothic Revival church buildings in Arkansas
Churches completed in 1889
Churches in Crawford County, Arkansas
National Register of Historic Places in Crawford County, Arkansas